Enerflex Ltd. is a worldwide supplier of products and services to the global power generation and gas production industry, based in Calgary, Alberta.

Profile

Headquartered in Calgary, Alberta, Canada, Enerflex has approximately 2,200 employees and provides natural gas compression, oil and gas processing equipment for sale or lease, refrigeration systems, power generation equipment and a comprehensive package of field maintenance and contracting capabilities. Enerflex, it subsidiaries, interests in affiliates and joint-ventures, operate in Canada, the United States, Argentina, Colombia, Brasil, Mexico, Australia, the United Kingdom, the United Arab Emirates, Kuwait, Oman, Bahrain, and Indonesia.

References

External links

See also

 Oil well 
 Drilling 
 OPEC 
 List of oil-producing states

Companies listed on the Toronto Stock Exchange
Oil companies of Canada
Natural gas companies of Canada
Companies based in Calgary